Michel Nowak (born 1962) is a French judoka and Olympic medalist. He won a bronze medal at the 1984 Summer Olympics in Los Angeles.

References

1962 births
Living people
French male judoka
Olympic judoka of France
Judoka at the 1984 Summer Olympics
Olympic bronze medalists for France
Olympic medalists in judo
Medalists at the 1984 Summer Olympics
20th-century French people
21st-century French people